Kenneth "Ken"/"Jubby" Jubb (birth registered second ¼ 1912 – 1993) was an English professional rugby league footballer who played in the 1930s and 1940s. Jubb was a Sergeant Major in the British Army during the Second World War.

Background
Ken Jubb's birth was registered in Wakefield district, West Riding of Yorkshire, England, he was later the landlord of the Town Hall Tavern, 17 Westgate, Leeds until  when his fellow Leeds rugby league footballer Dai Jenkins Jr. became the landlord, and he died aged .

Playing career

International honours
Jubb won caps for England while at Leeds in 1933 against Australia, in 1938 against Wales, in 1941 against Wales, in 1943 against Wales, and won caps for Great Britain while at Leeds in 1937 against Australia (2 matches).

County honours
Jubb won a cap for Yorkshire while at Castleford playing left-, i.e. number 11, in the 30–3 victory over Lancashire at Belle Vue, Wakefield on 29 October 1932.

Challenge Cup Final appearances
Jubb played left-, i.e. number 11, in Leeds' 18–2 victory over Warrington in the 1935–36 Challenge Cup Final during the 1935–36 season at Wembley Stadium, London on Saturday 18 April 1936, in front of a crowd of 51,250, and played left-, i.e. number 11, in Leeds' 15–16 aggregate defeat by Dewsbury in the 1942–43 Challenge Cup Final during 1942–43 season; the 9–16 defeat by Dewsbury at Crown Flatt, Dewsbury on Saturday 24 April 1943, in front of a crowd of 10,740, and the 6–0 victory over Dewsbury at Headingley, Rugby Stadium, Leeds on Monday 26 April 1943, in front of a crowd of 16,000.

County League appearances
Jubb played in Castleford's victory in the Yorkshire County League during the 1932–33 season.

County Cup Final appearances
Jubb played left-, i.e. number 11, in Leeds' 14–8 victory over Huddersfield in the 1937–38 Yorkshire County Cup Final during the 1937–38 season at Belle Vue, Wakefield on Saturday 30 October 1937.

Other notable matches
Jubb played right-, i.e. number 12, for Northern Command XIII against a Rugby League XIII at Thrum Hall, Halifax on Saturday 21 March 1942.

Jubb and the 1938 Championship Final
Jubb missed one of the biggest sporting events ever to take place in Leeds; Leeds 2–8 defeat by Hunslet in the Championship Final 1937–38 season at Elland Road on Saturday 30 April 1938, following his suspension for being sent off in a previous game.

Tributes to Jubb
In the book Nothing but the Best. Outstanding Leeds Rugby Players 1928–1988, the former Leeds secretary Ken Dalby paid the following tribute to Jubb:

Highest today, Jubby! Resilient as an India-rubber ball, restless as a panther patrolling its patch, Ken Jubb was a rattling good forward, whose 'party piece' was a massive punt, occasionally way off target, that soared into outer space to the accompaniment of good-natured banter from Headingley Rugby Stadium's South Stand. Moreover, from time to time, as an encore to one of his pile driving touchline cover tackles, he would slip in an acrobatic extra, cartwheels and flips being his speciality. We loved the guy!

References

External links
ken jubb and the 1938 championship final at rugby league oral history.co.uk 
Kenneth Jubb Memory Box Search at archive.castigersheritage.com
Ken Jubb Memory Box Search at archive.castigersheritage.com
Search for "Kenneth Jubb" at britishnewspaperarchive.co.uk
Search for "Ken Jubb" at britishnewspaperarchive.co.uk

1912 births
1993 deaths
British Army personnel of World War II
British Army soldiers
Castleford Tigers players
England national rugby league team players
English rugby league players
Great Britain national rugby league team players
Leeds Rhinos players
Northern Command XIII rugby league team players
Publicans
Rugby league players from Wakefield
Rugby league second-rows
Yorkshire rugby league team players